Amerika is a hamlet in the Netherlands. It is part of the village of Een, in the Noordenveld municipality in Drenthe.

Amerika is not a statistical unit, and does not have town limit signs. It contains about 25 houses, a camping and some bungalow parks. It is a forested area and mainly has a recreational use.

Just north of the hamlet is the recreational ground Ronostrand, a swimming pool in an old sand mine.

References 

Populated places in Drenthe
Noordenveld